Salome is a 1973  British horror and short film directed and produced by Clive Barker. This film has been music composed by Adrian Carson.The film starring Anne Taylor, Graham Bickley, Clive Barker, Doug Bradley and Phil Rimmer in the lead roles.

Cast
 Anne Taylor
 Graham Bickley
 Clive Barker
 Doug Bradley
 Phil Rimmer
 Lyn Darnell
 Julia Blake

References

External links
 

1973 films
1973 horror films
British horror short films
1973 short films
Films directed by Clive Barker
1970s English-language films
1970s British films